Rathmannsdorf is a railway station in the village of Rathmannsdorf, Saxony, Germany. Until 1938 the station was known as Wendischfähre. The station lies on the Bautzen–Bad Schandau railway. The station is served by one train service, operated by DB Regio in cooperation with České dráhy: the National Park Railway. This service connects Děčín and Rumburk via Bad Schandau and Sebnitz.

References

External links
Network map
Städtebahn Sachsen website
Rathmannsdorf station at www.sebnitztalbahn.de 

Railway stations in Saxony
Railway stations in Germany opened in 1877